Sunnybank is a suburb in the City of Brisbane, Queensland, Australia. It is known for its many Asian shops and restaurants.

History

The Jagera Indigenous people were the first to inhabit the area well over 20,000 years ago.

Early settlers noticed that the Sunnybank district had good rainfall and a beautiful loamy soil, somewhat sandy in character, that produced beautiful displays of natural wild flowers. From the mid-19th century it developed into a farming area with prosperous fruit and poultry farms and gardens of every kind.

The Town of Sunnybank was surveyed in 1886.  The name came from a property called Sunny Brae Estate owned by the Gillespie family.  In the 19th century it was part of a much larger area known as the Parish of Yeerongpilly, but a distinct town outside of the area known as Brisbane. In 1885, the railway line was extended from Yerongpilly, and names had to be given to the railway stations along the line. Sunnybank got its name from a local farm, Sunnybrae, owned by the Gillespies, when  of land were taken over for the railway. Brae is Scottish for the English word bank, so the area was given boundaries and named Sunnybank.

The present suburb much reduced in size from the previous suburb of Sunnybank. The separate town of Sunnybank was absorbed into the City of Brisbane in 1925. This older Sunnybank area is still known locally as Sunnybank. Rolling hills and the headwaters for both Stable Swamp Creek and Bulimba Creek have drawn people and wildlife to the Sunnybank area.

Development
By the first part of the 20th century, farmland increasingly gave way to suburbia. General Motors Holden established a car manufacturing plant on Bradman Street at Acacia Ridge, creating a major source of employment for the entire city of Brisbane.

On 21 June 1914 a group of adherents of the Church of Christ began holding services in private homes. The group purchased a block of land and cleared it. The congregation was formally established in April 1915 with 18 foundation members. The first church was erected in 1918 and moved to a more central location in 1922. By 1975 the church relocated to its present chapel and hall at 105 Station Road.

Opening in 1938, The Oasis, with lush gardens, swimming pools and a mini zoo became Brisbane's most popular tourist attraction. The tropical gardens themselves attracted national and international attention. The Oasis's popularity really took off in 1942 when, during the Second World War, thousands of American military personnel stationed in Brisbane used the Oasis as a rest and recreation venue. The Oasis was located at 141 Station Road.

With the 1982 Commonwealth Games being held at the Queen Elizabeth II sporting complex (QE II), now known as the Queensland Sport and Athletics Centre (QSAC), and Expo 88 years later, Brisbane and its suburbs like Sunnybank were shown to the world. With new land releases rare in the region, developers have turned to building higher density residential and commercial projects.

The median age of the Sunnybank population was 34 years, 3 years below the Australian median. 44.1% of people living in Sunnybank were born in Australia, compared to the national average of 69.8%; the next most common countries of birth were China 15.1%, Taiwan 7.1%, India 3.5%, New Zealand 2.8%, Vietnam 2.3%. 48% of people spoke only English at home; the next most common languages were 20.4% Mandarin, 7.4% Cantonese, 2% Vietnamese, 1.7% Korean, 1.6% Punjabi.

Asian influence on culture

In the late 1980s, an increasing number of Asian immigrants began to settle in Sunnybank and neighbouring suburbs. The influx of Asian immigrants caused the look of the area to change, especially in the primary business district of Sunnybank at the intersection of Mains Road and McCullough Street, where Asian restaurants and businesses are numerous.

Sunnybank is today a thriving multicultural suburb, with strong Asian influences in design, food and culture. Many of the suburb's shops and businesses are owned and run by people of Asian descent who call Australia home, with many bilingual business signs written in Chinese and English.

Education 

Sunnybank State School is a government primary (Prep-6) school for boys and girls at 50 Eddington Street. It includes a Special Education Program. In 2017, the school had an enrolment of 340 students with 27 teachers (22 full-time equivalent) and 19 non-teaching staff (11 full-time equivalent).

Despite its name, Runcorn State School is a government primary (Prep-6) school for boys and girls at 646 Beenleigh Road in Sunnybank. It includes a Special Education Program and a Special Education Unit. In 2017, the school had an enrolment of 437 students with 33 teachers (27 full-time equivalent) and 19 non-teaching staff (12 full-time equivalent).

Sunnybank State High School is a government secondary (7-12) school for boys and girls at Boorman Street. It includes the Sunnybank Special Education Unit. In 2017, the school had an enrolment of 664 students with 67 teachers (63 full-time equivalent) and 42 non-teaching staff (32 full-time equivalent).

Sunnybank Special School is a special primary and secondary (Early Childhood-12) school for boys and girls at 79 Troughton Road. It includes an Early Childhood Development Program. In 2017, the school had an enrolment of 38 students with 14 teachers (11 full-time equivalent) and 17 non-teaching staff (10 full-time equivalent).

Our Lady of Lourdes Primary School is a Catholic primary (Prep-6) school for boys and girls at Shearwin Street. In 2017, the school had an enrolment of 509 students with 37 teachers (31 full-time equivalent) and 15 non-teaching staff (10 full-time equivalent).

St Thomas More College is a Catholic secondary (7-12) school for boys and girls at the corner of Troughton Road & Turton Street. In 2017, the school had an enrolment of 1012 students with 75 teachers (74 full-time equivalent) and 34 non-teaching staff (27 full-time equivalent).

Carinity Education is a private secondary (7-12) school for girls at 153 Lister Street. The school provides a supportive individual learning environment for girls who have difficulties with mainstream schooling. In 2017, the school had an enrolment of 114 students with 10 teachers (8 full-time equivalent) and 18 non-teaching staff (14 full-time equivalent).

Amenities 

The Sunnybank Coopers Plains branch of the Queensland Country Women's Association meets at the St. Barnabas Anglican Church Hall at 189 Lister Street.

Shopping 
Sunnybank includes shopping centres along Mains Rd, such as Sunnybank Plaza, which features a Kmart, Coles and a Hoyts Cinemas. Sunny Park shopping centre is located across the road from Sunnybank Plaza and features a Woolworths supermarket. The centre was previously anchored by a Big W discount department store, which is the only Big W store in Brisbane that has closed, and a Sam's Warehouse store, which has also since closed. Market Square, located across from these two centres, is a community-based centre that is Asian-focused, featuring numerous Asian shops and restaurants. Other shopping centres that are nearby to Sunnybank include Centro Pinelands, Oasis Shopping Village, Westfield Garden City, Sunnybank Hills Shoppingtown and Calamvale Central.

Places of worship 
Sunnybank neighbourhood has many spiritual sites, including Anglican, Assemblies of God, Baptist, Catholic, Chinese Methodists, Christian and Missionary Alliance, Churches of Christ, Lutheran, Mormon/The Church of Jesus Christ of Latter-Day Saints, Presbyterian, Runcorn Christian, Southside International Church, The Great Commission and Uniting churches, Chung Tian Temple, Masjid Al Farooq (Kuraby Mosque), and The Brisbane Synagogue.

Sunnybank Church of Christ is at 105 Station Road.

Sunnybank Wesleyan Methodist Church meets at the Church of Christ. It is part of the Wesleyan Methodist Church of Australia.

Sport 
Sunnybank is home of the Souths Sunnybank Rugby League Football Club, the second oldest rugby league club in Brisbane, and the Sunnybank Dragons Rugby Union Club.

Transport 

Sunnybank is a busy area, and there have been ever-growing traffic problems in the area. Mains Road can become gridlocked around peak-hour, packed with cars and buses, as commuters make the slow ride home, although construction has widened and improved the Mains Road bridge which crosses the train line at Altandi. Sunnybank plaza has a small bus stop, which serves as one of the major stops on most bus routes in the area.

Banoon railway station, Sunnybank railway station and Altandi railway station provides access to regular Queensland Rail City network services to Brisbane and Beenleigh.

Climate

Notable residents

 Len Ardill, politician
 Ben Cutting, Australian cricketer, born in Sunnybank
 Ken Ham, President of Answers in Genesis
 Samantha Reid, member of Australian Olympic team, synchronized swimmer.
 Johnathan Thurston, Queensland Maroons, Australia and North Queensland Cowboys halfback.
 Lote Tuqiri, dual code rugby international
 Daniel Vidot, Samoan professional wrestler, and former rugby league player

References

External links

 
 University of Queensland: Queensland Places: Sunnybank
A Suburban Oasis: Sunnybank's Oasis Swimming Pool & Gardens - State Library of Queensland

Suburbs of the City of Brisbane